The National Panasonic Open is a defunct WTA Tour affiliated women's tennis tournament played in Australia from 1980 to 1985. It was held at Adelaide in 1980, at Perth in 1981, and at the Milton Tennis Centre in Brisbane from 1982 to 1985. The tournament was played on grass courts.

Finals

Singles

Doubles

References
 WTA Results Archive

 
Grass court tennis tournaments
Defunct tennis tournaments in Australia
WTA Tour